John W. Barrett is a mathematician who was a professor at Imperial College, London until 2019. He held the position of Head of Numerical Analysis in the Department of Mathematics.

References

Living people
Year of birth missing (living people)